Takleh-ye Abbasabad may refer to:
 Takleh-ye Abbasabad-e Olya
 Takleh-ye Abbasabad-e Sofla